Ama K. Abebrese (born 3 May 1980) is a British-Ghanaian actress, television presenter and a producer. She was born in Ghana and raised in West London in the United Kingdom. She won the 2011 Best Actress in a Leading Role at the AMAA Awards for her stellar performance in Sinking Sands. Her film credits includes  Azali (film) which is Ghana first ever selection for the Oscars; and the 2015 Netflix movie Beasts of No Nation directed by Cary Fukunaga and stars Idris Elba. She plays the mother to lead young actor Abraham Attah who plays Agu. Abebrese is listed among Africa's Top 20 Actors and Actresses by FilmContacts.com. She is the narrator and a producer on the Blitz Bazawule film The Burial of Kojo which was acquired by Array and was released on Netflix.

She is an accomplished television presenter with over two decades of experience. Ama K started her TV presenting career in her teens at YCTV in London. She has presented on BBC2, OBE TV, Viasat 1,  TV3, Ebonylife TV and many more.

Education 

She attended William Morris Sixth Form in Hammersmith after completing secondary school at Burlington Danes Academy. She holds a Bachelor of Arts in Media Arts and Drama obtained at St Mary's University, Twickenham.

Career 

Ama K. Abebrese started her training at YCTV (Youth Culture Television) in London, an organization started by Sabrina Guinness on the TV show Challenge Anneka. She was a presenter on BBC2 youth show Pass da Mic and a guest presenter on the English File educational series. She developed a love for acting after joining the Lyric Theatre (Hammersmith) Summer Company as a youth. 
Abebrese was a regular TV presenter on the now defunct OBE TV in London, hosting and producing on a number of shows including One Touch, and the entertainment chat show On The Sofa, where guests she has interviewed range from Akon to Ziggy Marley. She has interviewed the likes of Harrison Ford, Ne-Yo, Rihanna, and Star Wars director George Lucas among notable others.

Her film credits include the international multiple award-winning film Sinking Sands, directed by 2011 BAFTA LA and Pan African Film Festival prize winner Leila Djansi. The film received 12 nominations at the 2010 Ghana Movie Awards, including "Best Actress in a Leading Role", the film won four awards, including "Best Film". Other film credits are Revele film's Elmina and London Get Problem. She starred and co-produced the movie Double-Cross, which won two awards for "Best Cinematography" and "Best Hair and Makeup" at the 2015 Ghana Movie Awards.

She is the former Head of Own Productions and Executive Producer at Viasat 1 television station in Ghana. She was the host of A Day in the Life TV show which aired on Viasat 1; she co hosted New Day on TV3  weekday mornings.

In 2013, Ama alongside Nollywood actress Dakore and comedian Ayo Makun hosted the 2013 edition of the AMAA Awards.

She was named among C Hub magazine's 100 most influential 'African Women Influencers' of the era 2014/15. She was ranked the  Number 1 Most Influential TV and Radio Host 2015 on the Ghana Social Media Rankings List

Filmography

Promotional work 

In 2014, Ama was unveiled as Dark and Lovely's Brand Ambassador for Ghana.

Causes

Say no to skin bleaching
Ama is the founder of the "I Love My Natural Skintone. Say NO to Skin Bleaching" campaign, which she launched in 2014, it seeks to address issues of colorism and encourage Africans and people of color to embrace their natural skin tones and resist from the often harmful practice of skin bleaching. The focus is mostly on females to appreciate their different and unique skin tones, with the assertion that beauty comes in all different shades

Child safety icon
Ama K is a "Child Safety Icon" for the charity SafeChild Ghana, an organization whose primary goal is to keep the children safe from harm.

Free rape medical kits
Ama launched a petition in July 2020 in Ghana calling on the government to waive fees attached to the medical examinations of rape victims. The fees being charged became an impediment because without a proper medical examination no prosecution could be undertaken by the police and majority of the rape victims could not afford the fees. This led to a nationwide campaign which got her a meeting with the First Lady of Ghana Rebecca Akufo-Addo and Gender Minister Cynthia Morrison to implore the government to scrap the fees associated with the examination kits.

Awards and nominations

References 

Living people
Ghanaian emigrants to the United Kingdom
English television presenters
Best Actress Africa Movie Academy Award winners
Ghanaian film actresses
21st-century English actresses
1980 births
People from Kumasi
English film actresses
Naturalised citizens of the United Kingdom